The Association for Politics and the Life Sciences (APLS) was formed in 1981 and exists to study the field of biopolitics as a subfield of political science. APLS owns an academic peer-reviewed journal, Politics and the Life Sciences (PLS), which is published semi-annually by Cambridge University Press.

External links 
 
 Politics and the Life Sciences

Organizations established in 1981
Biology organizations
Political science organizations